The foreign and intergovernmental relations of Puerto Rico are governed by the Commerce and Territorial Clause of the Constitution of the United States. Because of this, they are subject to the plenary powers of Congress. Nonetheless, Puerto Rico has established relations with foreign nations, particularly with Hispanic American countries such as Colombia and Panamá. The establishment of such relations, however, requires permission from the U.S. Department of State or Congress itself. Still, most relations are already set by existent laws or trade agreements established beforehand by the United States that supersede the relation pursued by Puerto Rico.

At the local level, Puerto Rico established through a domestic law that its foreign affairs must be managed by the Department of State of Puerto Rico, an executive department. The executive officer of this department is known as the Secretary of State of Puerto Rico, currently Víctor Suárez Meléndez, an attorney and veteran public servant, and member of the Popular Democratic Party and of the Democratic Party of the United States.

In a similar fashion, the Puerto Rico Federal Affairs Administration, along with the Office of the Resident Commissioner, manage all the intergovernmental affairs of Puerto Rico before entities of, or in, the United States. These entities include the federal government of the United States, local and state governments of the United States, and public or private entities in the United States. Both offices frequently assist the Department of State of Puerto Rico in engaging with Washington, D.C.-based ambassadors and federal agencies that handle Puerto Rico's foreign affairs, such as the U.S. Department of State and the Agency for International Development (USAID).

In terms of leadership, the Administration is headed by a director while the Office is headed by the Resident Commissioner of Puerto Rico. Juan Eugenio Hernández Mayoral currently heads the administration, a former senator in the Puerto Rican legislature, and a member of the Popular Democratic and of the Democratic Party. Politically, the resident commissioner possesses a higher rank as she is the delegate elected by Puerto Ricans to represent them in Congress, specifically within the U.S. House of Representatives. Her rank stems from the right to serve on congressional committees, a right she exercises in every aspect like that of any other legislator, except being denied a vote on the final disposition of legislation on the House floor. The post is currently held by Jenniffer González-Colón, a Republican. She was elected in 2016, receiving more votes than any other official elected in Puerto Rico that year.

History
Prior to the arrival of Spaniards, the natives of Puerto Rico, the Taíno, had direct foreign relations with other tribes of the Caribbean. For example, they were known to have amicable relations with the tribes settled in the Greater and the Lesser Antilles, while it is widely believed that they were historical enemies of the Carib. It is unknown, however, if this applied to the Taíno of Puerto Rico, as archeologists believe they may have been allies with the Carib at some point. Findings so far have been inconclusive.

Upon the arrivals of Spaniards in 1493, Puerto Rico opened up to both the New and the Old World, establishing trading routes with North, Central and South America, as well as routes with Spain, Portugal and Africa. Trading of vegetables, fruits, slaves, and minerals became an integral part of Puerto Rico's international development afterwards.

After Puerto Rico was ceded to the United States as part of the Treaty of Paris, the United States and Puerto Rico began a long-standing metropolis-colony relationship. It is at this time that Puerto Rico became subject to the Commercial and Territory Clause of the U.S. Constitution, clauses that restrict how and with whom can Puerto Rico engage internationally. The territory also became, as a byproduct, subject to the different treaties and trade agreements ratified by the United States.

In 1920, after the enactment of the Merchant Marine Act of 1920 (also known as the Jones Act), Puerto Rico became restricted on which merchant marine it can use to import and export products. This is because the Jones Act prevents foreign-flagged ships from carrying cargo between two American ports (a practice known as cabotage). Under the Jones Act, foreign ships inbound with goods from Central and South America, Western Europe, and Africa cannot stop in Puerto Rico, offload Puerto Rico-bound goods, load mainland-bound Puerto Rico-manufactured goods, and continue to U.S. ports. Instead, they must proceed directly to U.S. ports, where distributors break bulk and send Puerto Rico-bound manufactured goods to Puerto Rico across the ocean by U.S.-flagged ships.

In modern times, Puerto Rico has been able to establish several treaties and trade agreements mostly with Hispanic American nations due to their cultural and linguistic similarities. Today, Puerto Rico has trade agreements with Colombia and Panamá, along with strong ties with its neighbors in the Caribbean Sea, particularly with the Dominican Republic and the United States Virgin Islands.

International organizations
Puerto Rico is restricted to join international organizations without the consent of the United States due to its current political status. However, due to its geographical and cultural nature, the U.S. Department of State allows Puerto Rico to be an observer in most international organizations to which it would potentially belong to if Puerto Rico were a sovereign state.

Puerto Rico was denied observer status by the U.S. Department of State within the Community of Latin American and Caribbean States (CELAC) due to the anti-American rhetoric of some of its founders, namely Bolivia, Cuba, and Venezuela. However, on January 9, 2014, Venezuelan President Nicolas Maduro announced a proposed plan to incorporate Puerto Rico into CELAC, without waiting for required U.S. federal consent.

Treaties

Trade agreements

Military conflicts

The federal government of the United States is responsible for the military protection of Puerto Rico. Residents of Puerto Rico who are either citizens or permanent residents can serve in the United States armed forces. At the local level, Puerto Rico has its own national guard, namely the Puerto Rico National Guard. The governor of Puerto Rico is the local commander-in-chief, while the national commander-in-chief is the President of the United States. Puerto Ricans have served in the U.S. armed forces in every conflict since World War I and, most recently, have been part of the War on Terror including the War in Afghanistan and the Iraq War.

See also
 Foreign relations of the United States

Notes

References

 
Government of Puerto Rico
Politics of Puerto Rico